Amazing Disgrace is the fourth album by the Seattle alternative rock band the Posies, released in 1996. It was their final release for DGC Records.

Production
As was the case on previous albums, the band's label told the Posies to return to the studio to record more "'hit material.'" Cheap Trick's Robin Zander and Rick Nielsen appear on "Hate Song."

Critical reception
Robert Christgau wrote: "Of course it's not the Beatles or Big Star—merely emulated, the formal ideas don't sustain their excitement." The Washington Post wrote that the album's "combination of pretty melody and ugly thoughts is utterly contemporary." Trouser Press called the album "surprisingly sour but still delicious."

Track listing 
All songs by Jon Auer and Ken Stringfellow.
 "Daily Mutilation" – 4:04
 "Ontario" – 2:38
 "Throwaway" – 3:53
 "Please Return It" – 3:51
 "Hate Song" – 4:06
 "Precious Moments" – 3:47
 "Fight It (If You Want)" – 3:04
 "Everybody Is a Fucking Liar" – 3:15
 "World" – 3:57
 "Grant Hart" – 2:25
 "Broken Record" – 2:40
 "The Certainty" – 2:28
 "Song #1" – 5:39
 "¿Will You Ever Ease Your Mind?" – 3:51
 "Terrorized" - 04:11 (Bonus Track)

Personnel
The Posies
 Jon Auer – guitar, vocals
 Ken Stringfellow – guitar, vocals
 Joe Skyward – bass "found around 110 Hz"
 Brian Young – drums
Additional personnel
Jessica Lurie – tenor saxophone on "Please Return It"
Barbara Marino – baritone saxophone on "Please Return It"
Robin Zander – vocal "screams" on "Hate Song"
Rick Nielsen – guitar "freakout" on "Hate Song"
Steve Fisk – keyboards on "Broken Record"
Gavin Guss – trumpet on "Broken Record"
Roderick Wolgamott Romero – "mumbling undertaker" vocals on "Broken Record"
Production
Nick Launay – producer 
Steve Fisk – additional production on "Ontario"
John Goodmanson, Nick Launay – engineer 
Jon Auer, Keith Cleversley – engineer (additional)
Aaron Warner, John Burton, Mark Rosnick, Steve Culp – assistant engineer
Greg Calbi – mastering
Artwork and design
Tim Gabor – art direction, design 
Otto Bettmann, United Press International – photography (cover) 
Duncan Price, Joe Bass, Lance Mercer, Nordic Joe – photography (photographs)

Charts

References

1996 albums
The Posies albums
Geffen Records albums
Albums produced by Nick Launay
Albums produced by Steve Fisk
Albums recorded at Robert Lang Studios